{{DISPLAYTITLE:C16H19NO4}}
The molecular formula C16H19NO4 may refer to:

 Benzoylecgonine, the main metabolite of cocaine
 Norcocaine, a minor metabolite of cocaine
 Norscopolamine, a tropane alkaloid isolated from Atropanthe sinensis